The Japanese sparrowhawk (Accipiter gularis) is a bird of prey in the family Accipitridae which also includes many other diurnal raptors such as eagles, buzzards and harriers.

It breeds in China, Japan, Korea and Siberia; winters in Indonesia and Philippines, passing through the rest of South-east Asia. It is a bird of open and wooded areas.

Description
It is 23–30 cm in length, with the female larger than the male. Males have dark barred underwings, lightly barred underparts, dark grey upperparts and red eyes. Females have yellow eyes and dark barred underparts. Juveniles have brown upperparts and streaks on the breast.

It feeds on smaller birds taken in flight, and has occasionally been observed feeding on bats.

References

External links

 Photo blog

Japanese sparrowhawk
Japanese sparrowhawk
Birds of Japan
Birds of Korea
Birds of Manchuria
Japanese sparrowhawk